= Cocteaufest =

Music event

Cocteaufest is an event organized and held annually by fans of the Cocteau Twins from around the world who gather for a night of music, dancing, prizes, and socializing with other fans.

The event is a celebration of the artists, their music and their legacy. Throughout the event, fans sell unique merchandise, hold auctions, show other forms of memorabilia and rare items and give away free prizes. DJs and other bands may attend and perform their own renditions of their favorite Cocteau Twins songs.

Cocteaufest began in 2003 in Boston, MA and has since been organized and celebrated around the world.

== Years and locations ==
- 2003 – Boston, USA -
- 2004 – Los Angeles, USA
- 2005 – Toronto, Canada
- 2006 – Manchester, England
- 2007 – New York City, USA (private party) -
- 2008 – London, England
- 2009 – Muskoka, Canada
- 2010 – London, England
- 2011 – New York City, USA
- 2012 – São Paulo, Brazil -
- 2013 – Paris, France -
- 2014 – San Francisco, USA -
- 2015 – Santiago, Chile
- 2017 – Berlin, Germany
- 2018 – San Francisco, USA
- 2019 – San Francisco, USA
- 2020 – Virtual online party - São Paulo, Brazil; London, England; & San Francisco, USA
- 2021 – San Francisco, California, USA & online
